Jackie Joseph (born November 7, 1933) is an American actress and writer. She is best known for her role as Jackie Parker on The Doris Day Show (1971–1973) and Audrey in The Little Shop of Horrors (1960), as well as a supporting role in Gremlins (1984).

Early life
Joseph was born in Los Angeles County, California. Her mother was 19 at the time of Joseph's birth, and her father had died three months earlier. She studied at Los Angeles' John Marshall High School and UCLA.

Acting career
Joseph began her career as a featured performer and singer in the Billy Barnes Revue of 1958, with future husband and actor Ken Berry. 

Joseph's roles on television programs included Miss Oglethorpe on Run, Buddy, Run, Jackie Parker on The Doris Day Show, Sandy on The All New Popeye Hour. She was also a regular on The Bob Newhart Show (1961) and The Magic Land of Allakazam.

She is also known for portraying Audrey Fulquard in the original version of The Little Shop of Horrors (1960), as well as Charlene Hensley in Hogan's Heroes (1966), Sheila Futterman in Gremlins (1984) and Gremlins 2: The New Batch (1990), Mrs Kirkland in Police Academy 2: Their First Assignment (1985) and Police Academy 4: Citizens on Patrol (1987), and the voice of Melody in the animated series Josie and the Pussycats and Josie and the Pussycats in Outer Space.

She played the love interest of Willie (played by Bob Denver) in the film Who's Minding the Mint? (1967). Her other film work includes roles in A Guide for the Married Man (1967), With Six You Get Eggroll (1968), The Split (1968), The Good Guys and the Bad Guys (1969), The Cheyenne Social Club (1970), Get Crazy (1983), and Small Soldiers (1998).

Joseph's other television credits include The Andy Griffith Show (Season 4 Episode 17: "My Fair Ernest T. Bass" as Ramona Ankrum), The Dick Van Dyke Show (two appearances), That Girl, F Troop (Season 1 Episode 17: "Our Hero, What's His Name" as Corporal Randolph Agarn's girlfriend Betty Lou MacDonald), Hogan's Heroes (Season 1 Episode 28: "I Look Better in Basic Black" as Charlene Hemsley), McHale's Navy, Gomer Pyle, U.S.M.C. (four appearances), Petticoat Junction (1967 episode: 'A House Divided'), CHiPs (in a two-part episode), Full House and Designing Women (as Mary Jo's mother). She also appeared for a week on the game show Match Game '74. Although she appeared only once on the 1964 sitcom My Living Doll, as one of the few surviving actors to appear on the series she participated in a retrospective featurette included on the 2012 DVD release of the series.

Other activities
In 1977, Joseph became a fashion show producer, staging the Western Children's Brand Wagon show. An audience of 600 watched youngsters model one garment each from 85 companies.

Personal life
Joseph married her first husband, Ken Berry, on May 29, 1960.  On November 29, 1962, their son, Joseph Larson Berry, was born but died six days later. They then adopted two children, John (born 1964-2016) and Jennifer (born 1965-2020). Joseph and Barry divorced in June 1976. 

She has since remarried, to David Lawrence. Her son John died of brain cancer in 2016 at the age of 51, and her daughter Jennifer died in 2020 of natural causes.

Filmography

References

External links

Interview with Tom Weaver, bmonster.com 
"Talk With Jackie" columns, TolucanTimes.info 
"Travel with Lawrence & Lawrence", Jackie Joseph's travel columns, TolucanTimes.info

1933 births
Living people
Actresses from Los Angeles
American film actresses
American television actresses
American voice actresses
20th-century American actresses
21st-century American women